Sir John Carter (before December 20, 1741 – May 18, 1808), a Unitarian merchant, was on nine occasions Mayor of Portsmouth, Hampshire, England, the chief maritime port for the Royal Navy. He played a key role in defusing the crisis caused by the 1797 naval mutiny at Spithead. Members of his family were long influential in Portsmouth politics.

The eldest son of Susanna Pike and John Carter, a successful and respected merchant, John was baptised in the High Street Presbyterian (Unitarian) Chapel in Portsmouth. His parents, rational dissenters, refused to belong to the Church of England and, like both his grandfathers, were members of this chapel. In 1763, at 22, John was elected an alderman of the (then) borough of Portsmouth and, at the same time, started to act as a magistrate. He was mayor for a few months in 1769, but, as he was a Whig, the Tories soon turned him out of office. He was knighted on 22 June 1773, whilst again occupying the office.

His son John (1788–1838), a barrister and Member of Parliament for Portsmouth, changed his name to John Bonham-Carter to inherit from a cousin.

References

 
 

1741 births
1808 deaths
Mayors of Portsmouth
Councillors in Hampshire
English Unitarians
Knights Bachelor